Braulio Arenas (La Serena, April 4, 1913 - †Santiago May 12, 1988) was a Chilean poet and writer, founder of the surrealist Mandrágora group.

Life 

Braulio Arenas lived most of his youth in the north of Chile, moving in his teens to Talca to study. There he encountered Teófilo Cid and Enrique Gómez Correa among others, and participated to literary activities with them.

Years later, he started law studies in Santiago, which he soon abandoned to focus on writing. Through Eduardo Anguita, he met Vicente Huidobro, father of "Creationism" literary movement, which disputed literary innovations with Dada and Surrealism. Influenced by these European currents, Arenas founded with some friends, in 1938, the Surrealist group Mandrágora. This circle supported the Popular Front government. The same year, one of his short story, Gehenna, was published in Miguel Serrano's Antología del verdadero cuento en Chile.

Arenas received in 1984 the Chilean National Prize for Literature, winning some recognition albeit confidential editions of his works (often less than 800 exemplaries).

Works

 El mundo y su doble, 1940
 La mujer mnemotécnica, 1941 
 Luz adjunta, 1950
 La simple vista, 1950 
 En el océano de nadie, narraciones, 1951 
 La gran vida, 1952 
 El pensamiento transmitido, 1952 
 Discurso del gran poder, 1952 
 Ancud, Castro y Achao, 1953
 El cerro Caracol, narraciones, 1956 
 Versión definitiva, 1956 
 El a g c de la Mandrágora, 1957 
 Poemas 1934-1959, 1959 
 Adiós a la familia, novela, 1961 (reeditada por la Editorial Universitaria en 2000
 La casa fantasma, 1962
 Vicente Huidobro y el creacionismo, ensayos, 1964 
 El juego de ajedrez, o, Visiones del país de las maravillas, 1966
 Pequeña meditación al atardecer en un cementerio junto al mar, 1966 
 El castillo de Peth, novela, 1969 
 La endemoniada de Santiago, novela, 1969
 En el mejor de los mundos, antología poética 1929-1969; 1970
 Samuel, comedia en dos actos, 1970
 El laberinto de Greta, novela, 1971 
 Los mozos de Monleón, narraciones, 1971 
 La promesa en blanco, novela, 1972 
 Actas surrealistas, ensayo, 1974 
 Berenice: la idea fija, novela, 1975 
 Los esclavos de sus pasiones, novela, 1975 
 El cantar de Rolando, ensayo, 1975 
 El pintor Morales Jordán, ensayo, 1975 
 Una mansión absolutamente espejo deambula por una mansión absolutamente imagen, 1978
 Los sucesos de Budi, novela, 1980 
 La situación física del castillo kafkiano, 1980
 Escritos y escritores chilenos, ensayos, 1982 
 Visiones del pais de las maravillas, 1983 
 Los dioses del Olimpo, leyendas, 1983 
 La promesa en blanco, novela, 1984 
 Sólo un día del tiempo. Crónica del año 1929, 1984
 Escritos mundanos, 1985
 Memorándum chileno, 1987 
 Realidad desalojada, 2009
 La casa fantasma y otros poemas, 2012

References

External links 

 Página dedicada a Braulio Arenas
 Poemas de Braulio Arenas
 Estudios sobre Braulio Arenas
 Entrevista a Braulio Arenas por Ștefan Baciu
 Estudio de Luis G. de Mussy: Mandrágora: La Raíz De La Protesta O El Refugio Inconcluso (2001).

Chilean male poets
1988 deaths
National Prize for Literature (Chile) winners
1913 births
20th-century Chilean poets
20th-century Chilean male writers